Olivacine is an antimalarial alkaloid.

External links
 Comparative in vitro and in vivo antimalarial activity of the indole alkaloids ellipticine, olivacine, cryptolepine and a synthetic cryptolepine analog

Antimalarial agents
Indole alkaloids
Isoquinoline alkaloids
Carbazoles